The 2016 Brown Bears football team represented Brown University in the 2016 NCAA Division I FCS football season. They were led by 19th-year head coach Phil Estes and played their home games at Brown Stadium. They are a member of the Ivy League. They finished the season 4–6, 3–4 in Ivy League play to finish in a tie for fourth place. Brown averaged 4,419 fans per game.

Schedule

Source: Schedule

References

Brown
Brown Bears football seasons
Brown Bears football